Anauxesida lineata is a species of beetle in the family Cerambycidae. It was described by Karl Jordan in 1894.

References

Agapanthiini
Beetles described in 1894